Solidus (Latin for "solid") may refer to:

 Solidus (coin), a Roman coin of nearly solid gold
 Solidus (punctuation), or slash, a punctuation mark
 Solidus (chemistry), the line on a phase diagram below which a substance is completely solid
 Solidus Snake, a character in Metal Gear Solid 2: Sons of Liberty
 Solidus Labs, a cryptocurrency trade surveillance and risk monitoring company